A Tear and a Smile Strong in the Sun is a compilation album by Irish band Tír na nÓg. It was released on December 7, 2004 by BGO Records and contains the remasters of their two last studio albums from 1972 and 1973: the United Kingdom version of A Tear and a Smile, and Strong in the Sun.

Track listing
"Come And See The Show" (Sonny Condell) – 3:20
"Down Day" (Condell) – 5:51
"When I Came Down" (Leo O'Kelly) – 4:36
"The Same Thing Happening" (O'Kelly) – 4:51
"Bluebottle Stew" (Condell) – 2:28
"So Freely" (O'Kelly) – 3:40
"Hemisphere" (Condell) – 2:20
"Lady Ocean" (O'Kelly) – 4:37
"Goodbye My Love" (O'Kelly) – 4:23
"Two White Horses" (Condell) – 2:40
"Free Ride" (Nick Drake) – 3:04
"Whitestone Bridge" (Condell) – 4:12
"Teesside" (Condell) – 3:51
"Cinema" (O'Kelly) – 4:38
"Strong In The Sun" (O'Kelly) – 3:38
"The Wind Was High" (O'Kelly) – 3:19
"In The Morning" (Condell) – 3:22
"Love Lost" (O'Kelly) – 3:19
"Most magical" (Condell) – 3:46
"Fall Of Day" (Condell) – 2:34

Personnel

A Tear and a Smile
Sonny Condell – vocals, guitar, clavinette, percussion
Leo O'Kelly – vocals, guitar
Larry Steele – bass
Barry de Souza – drums
Paul Tregurtha – engineering
Nick Harrison – arranger
Tony Cox – production

Strong in the Sun
Sonny Condell – vocals, acoustic guitar, electric guitar, pottery drums, jaw harp
Leo O'Kelly – vocals, acoustic guitar, electric lead guitar, dulcimer, violin
Matthew Fisher – keyboards, production
Geoff Emerick – engineering

Additional personnel
Brian Odgers, Dave Markee, Jim Ryan – bass
Barry de Souza, Ace Follington, Jeff Jones – drums

Release history

References

Tír na nÓg (band) albums
2004 compilation albums